Più forti di prima is the first box set by Italian singer-television actress Barbara d'Urso, released on 13 December 2015 by Mondadori Records. It contains a special edition of the first book of the actress and a special studio album contains all her success. The cd contains 7 tracks, two original track of the 1979 LP Dolceamaro ("Dolceamaro" and "Se mi guardi così"), two remix tracks ("House Music" and "Uh Uh"), two cover tracks (the hit "Grande Amore" performed by Il Volo with d'Urso lead vocal performance and "Follow you Follow me" performed by Genesis with d'Urso rapper vocal performance, and one instrumental track (Follow you Follow me) from the d'Urso TV show "Pomeriggio 5". 
It was published on 21 December 2015 inn streaming on Spotify by the Italian singer. The book accompanying the CD in the package is written by d'Urso and tells stories of women. Is titled "Più forti di prima: Storie di donne dalla tragedia alla rinascita". This box set is considered by critics a  trash affair, devoid of any meaningful content. Some critics have ranked the album as flop. One day before publication, d'Urso announced she's working at her first studio album, that will be a collaboration with Italian composer Gianni Fiero, that 'll be released in late 2016. "Più forti di prima" is the first opera released by Mondadori Records.

2015 albums
Compilation albums by Italian artists